The Canadian Screen Award for Best Casting in a Television Series is an annual award, presented by the Academy of Canadian Cinema and Television as part of its annual Canadian Screen Award program, to honour the year's best casting work in television. 

The award was presented for the first time at the 21st Gemini Awards in 2006. It is separate from the Canadian Screen Award for Best Casting in a Film, which was presented for the first time at the 9th Canadian Screen Awards in 2021.

Until the 8th Canadian Screen Awards in 2020, the nominees and winners were exclusively narrative fiction series or television films; in that year, for the first time a reality show gained a nomination. The Academy has since announced that beginning with the 10th Canadian Screen Awards in 2022, two separate awards will be presented for casting in scripted and reality programming.

2000s

2010s

2010s

References

Casting
Casting awards